The 2008 S.League season is Geylang United's 13th season in the top flight of Singapore football and 33rd year in existence as a football club.

Squad

Coaching staff

Pre-Season Transfers

In

Out

Pre-Season Friendlies

S-League

Singapore Cup

Singapore League Cup

Player seasonal records
Competitive matches only. Numbers in brackets indicate appearances made. Updated to games played May 25, 2008.

Goalscorers

Goals conceded

Discipline

References

2008
Singaporean football clubs 2008 season

fr:Geylang United FC
ja:ゲイラン・ユナイテッドFC
zh:芽笼联足球俱乐部